Ilya Vasilevich (born 14 April 2000) is a Belarusian footballer who plays for BATE Borisov.

Career
Vasilevich is a product of Fortuna Minsk youth sportive school system. He spent his career in the Belarusian First League FC Baranovichi, but in January 2018 signed a 3 years deal with the Ukrainian Premier League FC Shakhtar Donetsk, that took an effect on April 15, 2018, the day, after Vasilevich's adulthood.

Club

Honours
BATE Borisov
Belarusian Super Cup winner: 2022

References

External links
 
 

2000 births
Living people
Belarusian footballers
Association football forwards
Belarusian expatriate footballers
Expatriate footballers in Ukraine
Belarusian expatriate sportspeople in Ukraine
FC Baranovichi players
FC Shakhtar Donetsk players
FC BATE Borisov players
FC Slavia Mozyr players